Emam may refer to:
Imam, an Islamic leadership position
Adel Emam (born 1940), Egyptian actor
Mohamed Emam (born 1984), Egyptian actor
Emam, Gilan, a village in Gilan Province, Iran
Emam Safi, a village in Khuzestan Province, Iran
Emam 3, a village in Khuzestan Province, Iran
Emam, Zanjan, a village in Zanjan Province, Iran
Emam Rural District, in Kurdistan Province, Iran
Emam (name), a surname
Imam Tawhidi, an Indian Australian man.
Sharjeel Imam, an Indian student activist.

See also
Emam is a common element in Iranian place names; see